Ghodawat Enterprises Pvt. Ltd. doing business as Star Air, is an Indian commuter airline based at Kempegowda International Airport in Bangalore, Karnataka. It started operations in January 2019, offering flights within Karnataka state as well as to neighboring Andhra Pradesh, Gujarat, Madhya Pradesh, Rajasthan, Uttar Pradesh, Maharashtra, as part of the Central Government's UDAN scheme. The airline makes use of Embraer 145 LRs for its services.

History
Sanjay Ghodawat Group, the parent company of Star Air, sought permission from the Central Government in March 2017 to establish a scheduled passenger airline called Star Air. The airline acquired its first aircraft, an Embraer 145LR, in June 2018. It obtained its Air Operator's Certificate in early January of the following year and announced that it would operate flights under the Central Government's UDAN scheme, which aims to improve regional connectivity within India. Kempegowda International Airport in Bangalore was selected as the base of operations. On 25 January 2019, the airline's first flight departed Bangalore for Hubbali. Flights to Tirupati were initiated as well.

Corporate affairs
The head office is at Star Air, Plot 13A, KIADB Hi-Tech Defence and Aerospace Park, Road No. 1, Bangalore-562149 Bangalore.

Destinations
Star Air flies to 17 domestic destinations within India, with its hubs at Kempegowda International Airport and Belagaavi Airport.

Fleet

As of March 2023, Star Air operates the following aircraft:

References

Airlines of India
Airlines established in 2017
Companies based in Bangalore
2017 establishments in Karnataka
Indian companies established in 2017